Cycling in Cardiff, capital of Wales, is facilitated by its easy gradients and large parks. In the mid-2000s between 2.7% and 4.3% of people commuted to work by cycling in the city. In 2017 12.4% of workers cycled to work at least 5 days a week. However, cyclists in the city are deterred from cycling by poor facilities and aggressive traffic, according to research by Cardiff University.

As the busiest city, Cardiff is statistically the most dangerous place to cycle in Wales. Between 1999 and 2008, 1,000 cyclists were injured on the road, 20% of all cycling accidents in Wales, although the number of injuries to cyclists continues to fall.

Council policy 
According to their Cycling Strategy (see below), Cardiff County Council aims to encourage citizens to cycle more, citing the improved health through increased fitness, reduced pollution and congestion of the local environment, economic gains through cycle tourism and leisure, independence for those people who cannot or do not wish to use a car, and the fact that cycling can be the quickest and most convenient form of transport in urban areas such as Cardiff. In 2002 they appointed a full-time Cycling Officer.

The council's Transport, Infrastructure and Waste service aims to ensure that an increase in cycling is matched with a reduction in the number of collisions involving cyclists.

Cardiff Council also provides off-road cycle training for school pupils to develop basic cycling skills based upon the National Cycling Proficiency Scheme. Training covers the Highway Code, negotiating obstacles, turning left and right, emergency stops and basic cycle maintenance. More than 1,500 children participate in this course every year in Cardiff, according to the council's Cycling Strategy.

The council produces a free map of the city, available from its offices or from cycle shops, highlighting cycle paths, lanes and suggested cycle routes.

Strategy 
The council's Cycling Strategy was adopted in 1998. The 2007 update showed that 2.7% of people living in Cardiff cycled to work in 2001, an increase from 2.6% in 1991. However, an Omnibus survey showed that in 2003 and 2005, 3.6% and 4.3% of people cycled to work respectively. Although, the number of children cycling to school fell from 5% to 2% since 1989–91. In the strategy, the council intends to:
encourage and promote cycling
provide safe facilities such as wider cycle lanes and advanced stop lines at traffic signals
conduct a trial scheme to assess the viability of allowing cycling through pedestrian areas in the city centre
improve cycle links between residential and commercial areas
facilitate integration with other modes of transport
improve and maintain the cycle network
develop and clearly sign routes

Cycleways 
Cardiff Council are in the process of developing 5 cycleways across the city. This falls in line with its strategy to provide far more segregation from motorised traffic for cyclists.

While work on the routes has already broken ground, some have criticised both certain design flaws and how long it is taking for consultations to be published, with only two published within as many years. While some routes are essentially brand new, others are facelifts or changes of priority for current routes, such as Cycleway 3 on Lloyd George Avenue, and Cycleway 2 on Newport Road.

The proposed Cycleway routes are:

 Cycleway 1: City Centre to Cathays, University Hospital Wales, Heath High Level and Heath Low Level Rail Stations, and North East Cardiff Strategic Development Site
 Cycleway 2: City Centre to Adamsdown, Newport Road retail parks, Rumney, Llanrumney and St Mellons Business Park
 Cycleway 3: City Centre to Cardiff Bay
 Cycleway 4: City Centre to Llandaff, Danescourt and North West Strategic Development Site
 Cycleway 5: City Centre to Riverside, Ely and Caerau.

Cycle facilities

Cycle Shops 
The 2011 Cardiff Council cycle map listed 12 cycle shops (down from 14 in 2009) in the city: in Canton, Cathays (Crwys Road), Cathays (Woodville Road), Gabalfa, Grangetown, Llandaff North, Llanrumney, Pontcanna, Rhiwbina, Roath (Broadway), Roath (Newport Road) and Whitchurch. Braddicks on Broadway, Roath, closed in January 2015 after 70 years trading.

Cycle lanes 
Some roads in the city provide distinct cycle lanes to the left of the vehicle lane. According to the Cardiff Cycle Map, these include:
West Cardiff
Cowbridge Road East and Castle Street: main western approach from Canton to the city centre
Wellington Street: parallel to Cowbridge Road East and part of the A4161 road
Pen-Hill Road and Cathedral Road: in Pontcanna
St Fagans Road and Pencisely Road: roads approaching Waun-Gron Park railway station in Fairwater

North Cardiff
Caerphilly Road: a main road in Birchgrove from the city centre to northern suburbs and part of the A469 road
Excalibur Drive: leads from Caerphilly Road to Lisvane and Thornhill railway station in Thornhill
Ty-Glas Road: leads from Caerphilly Road through Llanishen
Cathays Terrace: connects Crwys Road (the main road through Cathays) and Corbett Road (around Cardiff University)
Fairoak Road: connects Crwys Road and Wedal Road (near Roath Park)

South Cardiff
Penarth Road: part of the A4160 road leads from Callaghan Square near Cardiff Central to Grangetown
James Street: leads from Grangetown to Cardiff Bay

East Cardiff
Llanrumney Avenue: a main suburban road running through Llanrumney

Bus and cycle lanes 
There are also lanes that cyclists share with buses, motorcycles and taxis, in which it is illegal to drive on in any other motor vehicle. Such lanes are on:
Newport Road: in Rumney and Roath, East Cardiff
Westgate Street, St Mary Street and Wood Street: in the City Centre
Boulevard de Nantes and Dumfries Place: leading from Cathays Park in the centre to Newport Road and East Cardiff
Cowbridge Road East: from Canton to Ely Bridge in West Cardiff
Tudor Street: a main city centre approach from Riverside in West Cardiff

Segregated / off-road cycle paths 
Segregated cycle facilities can be a shared pavement with pedestrians, running alongside a road or through a park for example. This is denoted by a blue circular sign showing a bicycle and pedestrians. A cycle only route is denoted by blue circular sign showing only a bicycle. Much of the Taff Trail, Ely Trail and Rumney Trail are segregated from traffic. Other such routes in the city include:

West Cardiff
Llandaff Fields: through parkland area in Pontcanna, connecting with the Taff Trail

North Cardiff
M4 Junction 32: routes run under the junction from Coryton to Tongwynlais
Gabalfa Interchange: routes run over and round the junction as an alternative to vehicle routes 
University Hospital of Wales: routes run around Heath Hospital through King George Field

South Cardiff
North Road: from the Royal Welsh College of Music & Drama to Llys Talybont, connecting to the Taff Trail.
Leckwith Road: from Ninian Park railway station in Canton connecting to the Ely Trail.
Cardiff International Sports Village: the vicinity has a network of segregated routes connected to the Ely Trail in the west, Grangetown in the north, and Cardiff Bay in the east.
Lloyd George Avenue: from the City Centre to Cardiff Bay, part of Route 8
Central Link: parallel to the east of Lloyd George Avenue
Butetown: a route runs through a housing estate to Cardiff Bay, parallel to the west of Lloyd George AvenueRover Way: through an industrial and commercial estate between Adamsdown and Tremorfa

East CardiffLlanedeyrn: a route runs through the housing estate from St Mellons Road to Llanedeyrn InterchangePentwyn Drive: a route runs along this road in Pentwyn around Wern-goch Park and connects with the Rumney TrailSt Mellons: routes connect various parts of the suburbLlanrumney: a route connects Llanrumney Avenue with Ball Road, near the Rumney Trail Cycle parking 
There are bicycle stands for parking in locations including the following:

West CardiffCanton: Cowbridge Road East, Wellington Street and Llandaff RoadFairwater: Fairwater Library

North CardiffRhiwbina: Rhiwbina railway stationCathays: North Road (A470 road) and Cathays LibraryPenylan: Penylan Library

South CardiffCardiff Bay: around Mermaid Quay, Wales Millennium Centre, Atlantic Wharf and West Bute Street

Cardiff City CentreCentral Square: for Central bus and railway stationsCastle Street: near Millennium StadiumWood Street: at Millennium PlazaThe Hayes: for Cardiff Central LibraryWestgate Street: opposite Millennium StadiumThe Friary: for Queen StreetPark Place: for Queen StreetCharles Street: for Queen StreetChurchill Way: for Queen Street and Capitol Shopping CentreQueen Street: near junction with Newport RoadCardiff Queen Street railway stationCallahagn SquareCathays Park: at City HallAdamsdown: Roath Library

East CardiffRumney: Rumney LibraryLlanrumney: Llanrumney LibrarySt Mellons: St Mellons Library

 Cycle hire 

Pedal Power is a charity with their main bike centre in Pontcanna offering cycle hire facilities. Cycle training and cycle assessments are also available.

 OYBike 
In March 2009 the Welsh Assembly Government and Cardiff Council announced plans to introduce a free cycle hire scheme, with bike racks placed around the city, allowing people to pick up bikes and ride them to another point, where they would leave the bike. Money would also be put into creating more strategic cycle routes and cycle lanes. The system, similar to those in other large cities, launched in September 2009,"OYBike fails to ring my bell" Opinion "With Cardiff's answer to the Parisian Vélib relaunching this spring, we decided to take a city SmartBike for a whirl" 8 April 2010, at theguardian.com, Accessed 14 September 2017 and included 70 bikes and 35 hire points (initially 7) around the centre and the south of the city. The stations (in 2010) were: Central Station; Cardiff Castle; Central Library; Queen Street Station; Churchill Way; City Hall; eastern Queen Street; Cardiff Bay Station; County Hall; and Cardiff Bay Visitors’ Centre. It was necessary to register before using a bike. The first half an hour was free after which a small hourly fee was payable. The scheme, which was part of a £28.5 million plan to encourage residents in the capital to use sustainable transport and ease congestion, was welcomed by campaigners.

The cycle scheme run by OYBike ended in December 2011 after funding was removed by Cardiff council; the operator did not have other sponsors so the bikes along with their smart locks were removed from the city centre.

 Nextbike 

In June 2017 Nextbike was announced as the new provider of a public bike hire scheme for Cardiff. This would integrate new technology into the bikes, rather than the docking stations. Fifty bikes went 'live' in March 2018, with an official launch in May 2018 when the numbers would increase to 250. The bikes could be rented via a website, a telephone hotline, or by downloading a mobile app. Standard charges were £1 for every half hour period. Annual subscriptions were also available. Almost 7,800 people were registered for the scheme by June 2018. Nextbike has been both popular and successful, with Cardiff Council backing the scheme.

Nextbike has begun to introduced electric bikes across Cardiff, where users can rent and return electric bikes.

In 2021 Nextbike secured a sponsorship deal with OVO.

 Cycle refurbishment 
Cardiff Cycle Workshop, a bike workshop launched in July 2010 in Ely, refurbishes and repairs unwanted cycles, saving old bikes from the landfill and revitalises them for new owners at cheaper prices. Cardiff Cycle Workshop has an agreement with Cardiff Council for cages to be placed in the waste facilities in Fairwater and Grangetown for members of the public to leave their unwanted bicycles. Then the bikes are refurbished, checked for safety and have parts replaced. The bikes are then sold for anything from £10 to £150. Three year funding has come from the Big Lottery Fund.

 Cycling routes 

 Cross city north cycleway 
Cross city north cycleway began as a temporary cycleway along Cowbridge Road East, North Road, Boulevard de Nantes, Dumfries Place, and Newport Road. This runs around the city centre, connecting to cycleway 1, cycleway 4, and the Taff Trail. It will eventually also connect to cycleway 2 and cycleway 5.

 Cycleway 1 
Cycleway 1 is a bidirectional cycle track under development. It will eventually link the city centre to the suburb of Lisvane, with connections to the University Hospital of Wales, Heath High Level railway station, and Heath Low Level railway station. As of 2021, a section on Senghenydd Road had been completed, with construction under way on an extension to the University Hospital of Wales, costing £6,000,000.

 Cycleway 4 
Cycleway 4 is a bidirectional cycle track. It will eventually link the city centre to Llandaff, Danescourt, and Plasdwr. As of 2021, a section in Sophia Gardens has been completed, with consultations ongoing for an extension to Llandaff.

 Ely Trail 
The off-road Ely Trail is under development in the west and south of the city as of 2010, funded by the County Council, Visit Wales, and Countryside Council for Wales. So far completed is the northern section through St Fagans, Fairwater and Ely, and the southern section running from Leckwith to the south along the River Ely through Grangetown, finishing at the Cardiff International Sports Village. However, these sections are yet to be connected.

The route is connected to Cardiff City Centre via an off-road north-south route through Butetown. The Taff Trail at Cardiff Bay can also be joined from the trail via Grangetown and Butetown.

 Llys Tal-Y-Bont Cycleway 

The Llys Tal-Y-Bont Cycleway is a bidirectional cycle track approximately 0.5km long. It runs from a connection with the Taff Trail and the North Road Cycleway to the Excelsior Industrial Estate, with a connection to a bike park. Originally, this route was a 2m wide shared path, but work in 2020 upgraded it to a 2m wide path for pedestrians and a 4m wide separate path for cyclists. This also makes use of an existing underpass under Eastern Avenue.

 North Road Cycleway 

The North Road Cycleway runs from the city centre to Birchgrove. Upgrade work on an existing route began in 2018, and a 2020 upgrade to a large section of the cycleway means that it is both off-road for nearly all of its length and has a maximum width of 4 metres. The cycleway is separated from pedestrians for the newer section near the city centre. The route has been criticised for being too close to trees for much of the route, potentially leading to increased leaf litter.

 Rhymney Trail 
The off-road Rhymney Trail is being developed by the Council as a commuting and recreational route along the Rhymney River in the east of the city. Currently completed is the section between Llanedeyrn and Rumney. The Cardiff Cycle Map shows the route running off-road from Llanedeyrn Interchange, bypassing Llanrumney to the west, briefly joining Newport Road (B4487), and then heading south of Rumney to Wentloog Avenue (B4239). However, an off-road section also runs north-south through Pentwyn from Llanedeyrn.

 Taff Trail 

The 55-mile long Taff Trail runs from Cardiff Bay through Pontypridd and Merthyr Tydfil to Brecon, forming part of the Lôn Las Cymru – the National Cycle Network Route 8 to Holyhead.

 Route 88: Coastal route 

National Cycle Route 88 is a coastal cycle route being constructed from Newport to Margam Country Park, Bridgend, via Cardiff.

 Pont y Werin 

Pont y Werin (Welsh for The People's Bridge) is a pedestrian and cyclist bridge spanning the River Ely between Cardiff Bay and Penarth. This forms a key part of Route 88. Costing approximately £4.5 million, Pont y Werin crosses between the Cardiff International Sports Village and Penarth, allowing the public to travel to the Sports Village via Cogan railway station.

Opened on 14 July 2010, the bascule bridge completes the  Cardiff Bay circular walk and cycle route, and incorporates a 20-metre opening section to allow river traffic to pass. The whole bridge is a shared space for pedestrians and cyclists, and is not wide enough for segregation.

 Penarth 
In 2010 it was announced a commuter route for cyclists would be installed, aiming to improve transport links between Penarth and Cardiff Bay.

Integration

Cardiff rail network
Cycling is integrated into the city's urban rail network, which is operated by Transport for Wales Rail. Most trains have spaces for two cycles. However they are not permitted on services from Caerphilly, Radyr (except the City Line), Cadoxton, and Ebbw Vale Town to Cardiff Queen Street or Cardiff Central between 07:00 and 09:30, or services in the reverse direction 16:00 to 18:00 on weekdays. Outside these times, carriage is still at the discretion of the guard. Folding cycles can be carried folded-up at any time.

There is cycle storage at Cardiff Central station on all platforms, at the front and rear entrances to the station, and in the Riverside car park.

National rail network
Cycles are also permitted free of charge on the wider national network provided they can be safely stored in the designated areas and reservations through the train operator are recommended. Bikes must be carried in the designated area of the train and can't be stored in aisles or vestibule areas. Cycles can not be carried on rail-replacement coach services. Folding bikes can be carried at all times as normal hand luggage.

Transport for Wales also operates most of the Welsh rail network and its cycle policies apply to other services as well without the restrictions applied to the Cardiff rail network.

Buses
Cycles can not be carried on bus services in Cardiff. However, a Beacons Bus runs on Sundays and Bank Holidays in summer to Brecon which tows a cycle trailer to carry cycles. Efforts have been made to ensure there is bike parking next to bus stops.

Cycling Campaigns in Cardiff

 Sustrans Cymru 
Sustrans is a UK sustainable transport charity that constructs safe cycle routes and other inititiatives to encourage people to walk or cycle. Their Valleys Cycle Network project aims to add 100 miles of vehicle-free routes in the Valleys of South Wales.

In September 2011 it was announced that Sustrans Cymru were launching a new project in Cardiff funded by the Wales Government. This involved offering expert consultation to Cardiff householders to draw up personal travel plans, designed to reduce car journeys and encourage, amongst other things, increased use of bicycles.

Cardiff Cycling Campaign
The Cardiff Cycling Campaign campaigns for better provisions for cyclists in the city, believing that the council's attitude is inadequate. While it welcomes the Council's commitment to consider the needs of cyclists, it argues that these should not be marginal in relation to the management of cars and buses. A sea-change in thinking is required and available Council funds need to be used imaginatively to create 'coherent and continuous routes' through the city for cyclists. For example, safe cycling routes through the city centre were lost with the construction of the new St Davids 2 shopping centre.

In April 2006 the Campaign pointed out that only 2.7% of people cycled to work in Cardiff. Campaigners cycled through Cardiff city centre during a rush hour period, accompanied by local councillors and a Welsh Assembly Member. A participating councillor was quoted as saying 'I was happy to rise to the challenge but at times it was frightening. The cycle lanes were sometimes inadequate and complicated, and if I hadn't been with the campaign I probably would have got lost'.

Cycle CardiffCycle Cardiff aims to raise awareness of cycling and organises bike rides in and around the city.

World Naked Bike Ride
The Cardiff World Naked Bike Ride'' has taken place annually since 2008. This is part of a globally coordinated World Naked Bike Ride, designed to highlight the vulnerability of cyclists on the road and campaign for better cycling facilities. In June 2011 80 cyclists reportedly took part riding through the centre of Cardiff, many of them naked.

See also 
 Outline of cycling
Cycleways - Cardiff.gov.uk

References

External links

Cardiff Council cycling home page
Unofficial Taff Trail Website
Taff Trail in Cardiff
Keeping Cardiff Moving
OYBike – Cardiff Smart Bike hire
World Naked Bike Ride, Cardiff 
Pedal Power Bike Hire 

Cycling in Wales
Transport in Cardiff
Transport in Wales
Cardiff